Shanghai Expo Park is a park in the district of Pudong within Shanghai. It is situated in Pudong New Area. It is located near the Mercedes-Benz Arena.

Events
It hosted the Shanghai Expo 2010   and Strawberry Music Festival 2012. The park is close to Huangpu River, next to Mercedes-Benz Arena and the Expo Axis in Shanghai's Pudong New Area.

Features
The park includes the Expo Stage, and visitors can walk and travel along the Huang Pu riverside. The park's landscaping combines Western and Chinese gardening styles. Well known places in Expo Park include the cranes, the wetland and the lotus pond.

Transportation
Expo Park is best reached by taking Line 8, Shanghai Metro on the Shanghai Metro to Yaohua Road Station.

References

 

Urban public parks
Parks in Shanghai
World's fair sites in China
Pudong